Dwight Cal Pascal (born 7 March 2001) is an English footballer who plays as a defender for Kingstonian.

Career
Pascal made his debut for Barnet when he started an EFL Trophy game against Peterborough United on 8 November 2016. Aged 15, he became Barnet's youngest ever player, beating a record previously set by Mathew Stevens. Pascal continued with the academy to under-18 level and played two further first-team games, but was released by the Bees following the conclusion of his scholarship at the end of the 2018–19 season. He joined Potters Bar Town in November 2019. He played 19 games for the Scholars before re-joining Barnet on 1 October 2020. He left the Bees again at the end of the season, before joining Potters Bar again in time for the following season. Pascal joined Kingstonian for the 2022-23 season.

Career statistics

Notes

References

2001 births
Living people
English footballers
Association football defenders
Barnet F.C. players
Potters Bar Town F.C. players
Kingstonian F.C. players
English Football League players
National League (English football) players
Isthmian League players
Footballers from the London Borough of Hackney